Ricochet is a 1963 British crime film directed by John Llewellyn Moxey and starring Maxine Audley, Richard Leech and Alex Scott. Part of the long-running series of Edgar Wallace Mysteries films made at Merton Park Studios, it is based on the 1922 novel The Angel of Terror.

Cast
 Maxine Audley as Yvonne Phipps 
 Richard Leech as Alan Phipps 
 Alex Scott as John Brodie 
 Dudley Foster as Peter Dexter 
 Patrick Magee as Insp. Cummings 
 Frederick Piper as Siddall 
 June Murphy as Judy 
 Virginia Wetherell as Brenda 
 Alec Bregonzi as Max 
 Keith Smith as Porter 
 Peter Torquill as Sgt. Walters 
 Nancy Nevinson as Elsie Siddall 
 William Dysart as First Skater 
 Barbara Roscoe as Pretty Girl Skater 
 Anne Godley as Wardress 
 Maris Tant as Girl Skater 
 Marian Horton as Waitress

References

Bibliography
 Goble, Alan. The Complete Index to Literary Sources in Film. Walter de Gruyter, 1999.

External links

1963 films
British crime films
1963 crime films
1960s English-language films
Films set in England
Merton Park Studios films
Films directed by John Llewellyn Moxey
Edgar Wallace Mysteries
1960s British films